Singapore Children's Society (Chinese: 新加坡儿童会)  protects and nurtures children and youth of all races and religions. In 2018, the Society reached out to 78,433 children, youth and families in need.

Established in 1952, its services have evolved to meet the changing needs of children. Today, Children’s Society operates 12 service centres islandwide, offering services in the four categories of: Vulnerable Children and Youth, Children and Youth Services, Family Services, and Research and Advocacy.

Mission

To bring relief and happiness to children in need.

Vision

To be a leading edge organisation in promoting the well-being of the child.

Core Values

Compassion and Caring 
Commitment
Professionalism
Integrity
Openness to Change

History
Singapore Children's Society was founded on 17 April 1952 by a group of civic-minded citizens. The group started with a convalescent home for malnourished children in Changi that was subsequently gazetted as a Place of Safety in 1988. It was also the pioneer voluntary welfare organisation to provide opportunities for training of social work undergraduates from the then University of Malaya.

Founding of the Singapore Association for Retarded Children
During the 1960s, Singapore Children's Society founded the Singapore Association for Retarded Children. That same year, the Society also opened the Social Work Service office in Toa Payoh.

More programmes
Recognising a social trend towards dual income families, Singapore Children's Society launched a pilot project that reached out to latchkey children in 1979. Then in 1982 and again in 1984, the United Nations Association of Singapore awarded Children's Society the "Most Outstanding Civic Organisation" Gold Award.

The year 1984 also saw Singapore Children's Society launch Tinkle Friend, a hotline dedicated to children aged between 7 and 12 for them to voice out their problems. Four years later, in 1988, the Society initiated and developed voluntary services for the prevention of child abuse. The Child Abuse and Neglect Prevention Standing Committee (CANPSC) was formed to provide guidance and direction for the work undertaken.  The CANPSC was subsequently renamed to Research and Advocacy Research Committee in 2003.

In the 1990s, a series of developments took place that led to the opening of a Family Service Centre and the establishment of a Research Grant for Social Work.

Volunteer work
Telephone Counsellor
Tutoring
Mentoring
Share-a-skill
Fundraising

Financial Reporting

According to the 2016 Annual Report, the Society had $48,664,394 in cash and cash equivalents. The Society's operating expenses exceed $17 million a year. Employee Benefits Expenses totalled $10,419,015 in 2016. In the same year Administration expenses were $42,261, Fundraising Expenses were $33,933. For more information please see the financial report here: https://www.childrensociety.org.sg/resources/ck/files/newsletter-and-report/2016%20Audited%20Statement.pdf

References

External links
 Singapore Children's Society

C
C
C
Organizations established in 1952
Child-related organisations in Singapore